The Tusha Hiti, also known as Royal Bath, is a sunken bath used by the Malla royal family in Nepal. It is at the courtyard of Sundari Chowk, Patan Durbar Square, Lalitpur. King Siddhinarasimha Malla is credited with building the bath in the 17th century. The wall features idols of Ashta Matrikas, eight Bhariavs and Nagas, and the gilt copper spout features idols of Vishnu and Laxmi residing on Garuda. The Tusha Hiti is shaped like a yoni and can be accessed via its main entrance from the western façade.

History 

Malla Dynasty, the ruling dynasty of Kathmandu Valley, built various hitis for themselves that resembled their palaces enhanced with many decorations. Scholars are not certain about when the Tusha Hiti was built; some cite the years 1627, 1626, and 1647 AD. Siddhinarasimha Malla, who was mostly devoted to Hinduism, is credited with building the bath. 

The bath was mostly used by the kings for personal bathing. It might have had other purposes; one historian stated that it is impossible to use a bath without splashing the images of gods with the polluted water from the human body. Malla was an ascetic king who could not have used the bath to offend the gods with an "impure act". Other historians say that it was not made to be used as a bath but for "aqua-oblations" to gods.

According to the legend, the king used to wake up early in the morning and take a shower in the Tusha Hiti, then meditated for hours on the stone slab near the bath. After the shower, his attendants would provide him with towels and wraps, while the queen and others watched from the carved wooden windows. Apparently, then the king would lie on a stone bed and be massaged with oils.

After the 1934 Nepal–India earthquake, the Tusha Hiti was abandoned. It was restored in 1960.

Architecture 

The Tusha Hiti can be accessed via its main entrance from the western façade; the entrance features idols of Panchamukhi Ganesh and Narasingh. The spout is made of gilt copper and decorated with the idols of the Hindu god and goddess Bishnu and Laxmi residing over Garuda. The entire bath is shaped like yoni, a representation of female sexuality, and is surrounded by serpents. A small replica of the Krishna Mandir is featured in its main axis. The walls are decorated with idols of Ashta Matrikas, eight Bhariavs and Nagas. According to Desmond Doig, the water that came from the spout was "hot and perfumed suitable for a monarch's pleasure".

Name and legacy 
Historian Dhanavajra Vajracharya said that it was named Tusha Hiti because the water that came from the spout tasted like sugarcane juice; in the Newar language, tu means sugarcane and sha means taste. Another historian argues that the hiti's water source might have been from a well; in Newari, tun is a well and tunsala is the water brought from a well. In the course of time it became known as Tusha Hiti.

Many ancient hitis in Nepal have disappeared, and some are buried underground. Lalitpur has many hitis that are connected to underground water sources. 

The 1974 film Arabian Nights was shot in the courtyard of Sundari Chowk featuring the bath. 

It was reported in 2000 that bath was being guarded by the police. A 2015 report conducted by the Kathmandu Valley Preservation Trust noted that the bath was providing clean water in 2009, but after the April 2015 Nepal earthquake, the water became polluted.

One author found it to be "the most beautiful and elaborate hiti (bathing fountain) in Nepal". Nepali Times cited the well as the "most exquisite" legacy of the Malla Dynasty.

See also

 Alko Hiti
 Dhunge dhara
 Nagbahal Hiti

References

External links 
 
 360 degrees view of Tusha Hiti

Newa architecture
Lalitpur District, Nepal
Patan Durbar Square
17th-century establishments in Nepal
Drinking fountains in Nepal
Water supply infrastructure in Nepal